Karèn Shainyan is a Russian journalist.

Biography 
Shainyan is originally from Irkutsk, in Siberia, the son of two scientists. He obtained a university degree in biochemistry from the Russian National Research Medical University. Openly gay, he runs a Youtube channel called Straight Talk with Gay People, where he interviews international LGBT+ figures in order to dispel myths commonly held in Russia about the LGBT+ community. The channel's 2020 interview with American actor Billy Porter marked the first time a Russian journalist had interview Porter.

He co-founded the Future History studio with Mikhail Zygar. He was one of the creators of the 1968.Digital show that was presented at the 2018 Cannes Film Festival.

In August 2020, he released a documentary about the  titled The Chechen War on LGBT. In December 2020, he released a documentary titled Minsk: Queer and Techno Protest Against the OMON, documenting the experiences of the Minsk LGBT+ community during the 2020–2021 Belarusian protests and the subsequent repression by OMON, the Belarusian riot police.

In February 2022, he spoke out against the 2022 Russian invasion of Ukraine. In April 2022, he was designated a foreign agent by the Russian Ministry of Justice.

References 

Year of birth missing (living people)
Living people